Sture Ljungqvist (June 29, 1921 – April 28, 2004) was a Swedish architect.

Biography
Ljungqvist was born in Stockholm,  Sweden. He graduated from the KTH Royal Institute of Technology in 1946 and from the Royal Swedish Academy of Fine Arts  in 1950. He founded the architectural firm Höjer-Ljungqvist Arkitektkontor in 1952 together with  Jon Höjer (1922- 2014). In 1992, Höjer and Ljungqvist donated their architectural form to the employees   who changed its name to Origo Architects.

His architecture is characterised by complete complexes or whole city blocks with associated equipment such as malls, schools and libraries. 
Among his work was the re-design of Hästskopalatset, a combined commercial and office property in the Hästskon district in central Stockholm which underwent extensive rebuilding between  1971-1972.

References

External links
Origo arkitekter website

1921 births
2004 deaths
Swedish architects
KTH Royal Institute of Technology alumni
Businesspeople from Stockholm